Nature Reviews Chemistry is monthly online-only peer-reviewed scientific journal published by Nature Portfolio. It was established in 2017. The journal contains reviews, perspectives and comments in all disciplines within chemistry. The editor-in-chief is Stephen Davey.

Abstracting and indexing
The journal is abstracted and indexed in:

Science Citation Index Expanded
Scopus

According to the Journal Citation Reports, the journal has a 2021 impact factor of 34.571, ranking it 4th out of 179 journals in the category "Chemistry, Multidisciplinary".

References

External links 
 

Chemistry journals
Nature Research academic journals
Publications established in 2017
English-language journals
Online-only journals
Monthly journals
Review journals